The 2018–19 Czech Women's First League is the 26th season of the Czech Republic's top-tier football league for women. Sparta Praha were the defending champions.

Format
The eight teams will play each other twice for a total of 14 matches per team. After that the top four teams will play a championship round for another six matches per team. The bottom placed four teams play the relegation round. The champion and runners-up qualify for the 2019–20 UEFA Women's Champions League.

Teams

Stadia and locations

Regular season

Standings
The regular season ended on 19 April 2019.

Results

Final stage

Championship group
Played by the teams placed first to fourth of the regular season. Teams play each other twice.

Relegation group
Played by the teams placed fifth to eighth of the regular season. Teams play each other twice.

Personnel and kits

Note: Flags indicate national team as has been defined under FIFA eligibility rules. Players may hold more than one non-FIFA nationality.

Top goalscorers
Updated to games played on 9 June 2019.

References

External links
Season at souteze.fotbal.cz

2018–19 domestic women's association football leagues
2018–19 in Czech football
Czech Women's First League seasons